Wolfgang Schallenberg gcYC (3 June 1930 – 8 February 2023) was an Austrian diplomat. He was the Austrian ambassador to India (1974–1978), Spain (1979–1981), and France (1988–1992), and the Secretary General of the Ministry of Foreign Affairs (1992–1996).

A member of the comital branch of the noble Austro-Hungarian Schallenberg family, he was born in Prague as the son of the industrialist and diplomat Herbert, Count of Schallenberg (Herbert Graf von Schallenberg). He studied law at the University of Vienna as well as political science at French and British universities. In 1982, he was made a Knight Grand Cross of the Order of Isabella the Catholic (gcYC) by King Juan Carlos I of Spain.

His son, Alexander, is Minister of Foreign Affairs since 2019 interrupted by a short stint as Chancellor in 2021. Wolfgang Schallenberg died on 8 February 2023, at the age of 92.

References

1930 births
2023 deaths
People from Prague
Ambassadors of Austria to Spain
Ambassadors of Austria to France
Knights Grand Cross of the Order of Isabella the Catholic
Order of Civil Merit members
University of Vienna alumni
Wolfgang
Ambassadors of Austria to India
20th-century diplomats